Final Wild Songs is a four-CD compilation box set by American band the Long Ryders, released in 2016 by Cherry Red Records. It collects the debut EP 10-5-60, the three studio albums Native Sons, State of Our Union and Two-Fisted Tales, as well as a number of rare and unreleased tracks, including a full 1985 live set recorded for radio broadcast in the Netherlands.

The collection was researched and compiled by the Long Ryders' Tom Stevens and Sid Griffin and remastered from original master tapes, where available. "Still Get By", originally track 2 on Native Sons, is omitted from disc one, as requested by its writer Stephen McCarthy for unknown reasons, according to Tom Stevens.

Reception 

Final Wild Songs received positive critical reception upon release. Americana UK called it "truly glorious" and "an absolute essential purchase, even if one already has the original albums", and Vive Le Rock said it was "a great set for long-time fans and curious newcomers alike". In a four-star rating, Uncut wrote, "What’s clear now is that the Ryders are the bridge between country rock and what became Americana. ... They were country, and punk, and rock’n’roll. They did foot-on-the-floor boogie, cajun, a bit of psychedelic rock. They wore their fringes like Roger McGuinn. They were Tom Petty, without the heartbreak." Mojo stated, "They unwittingly invented Americana, but seldom receive credit for it. This 4-CD box set puts the record straight." R2 magazine wrote, "The set is tail-ended by a Dutch live recording from 1985, but it's much of a muchness really. It's the quality of the original releases themselves, plus the accompanying B-sides, outtakes and demos, that make this collection essential."

Track listing

Disc one: 1983–1984

Disc two: 1985

Disc three: 1986

Disc four: Live 1985

Note
Recorded live at the Esther Palais de Danse in Goes, the Netherlands, 6 April 1985.

Personnel
Credits are adapted from the album liner notes.

The Long Ryders
Sid Griffin – guitar, harmonica, autoharp, bugle, vocals
Steve McCarthy – guitar, mandolin, steel guitar, lap steel, banjo, keyboards, vocals
Tom Stevens – bass, double bass, cello, acoustic guitar, vocals (except disc one: 1–5)
Greg Sowders – drums, percussion, keyboards
Des Brewer – bass, vocals (disc one: 1–5)
Additional musicians
Gene Clark – additional vocals (disc 1: 7)
Dave Pearlman – steel guitar (disc 1: 9)
Phil Kenzie – tenor and baritone saxophone (disc 1: 11)
Lee Chaifetz – vocals (disc 1: 19)
Victoria Williams – vocals (disc 1: 19)
Snake Davis and his Longhorns – saxophone (disc 2: 3)
Vic Collins – pedal steel guitar (disc 2: 3)
Alan Dunn – accordion (disc 2: 13)
Steve Wickham – violin (disc 2: 14)
Christine Collister – vocals (disc 2: 14)
Debbi Peterson – vocals (disc 3: 2)
Vicki Peterson – vocals (disc 3: 2)
David Hidalgo – accordion (disc 3: 4)

Technical
Earle Mankey – producer, engineer (disc 1: 1–5)
The Long Ryders – producer (disc 1: 1–5, 16; disc 3: 12)
Henry Lewy – producer, engineer (disc 1: 6–15)
Paul McKenna – producer (disc 1: 6–15)
Will Birch – producer (disc 2: 1–14, 16–18)
Ed Stasium – producer, mixing (disc 3: 1–12, 21)
Neill King – engineer (disc 2: 1–14)
Paul Hamingson – engineer, mixing engineer (disc 3: 1–12), mixing (disc 3: 12)
Mark McKenna – assistant engineer (disc 3: 1–12)
Tom Root – assistant engineer (disc 3: 1–12)
Vince McCartney – assistant mixing engineer (disc 3: 1–12)
Nick Stewart – remix (disc 2: 16, 17)
Bill Inglot – engineer (disc 3: 14–16, 18, 19)
Paul B. Cutler – engineer (disc 3: 13, 17, 20)
Willem Mindermann – engineer (disc 4) 
Danny Mindermann – engineer (disc 4)
Andy Pearce – mastering 
Phil Smee – artwork

References 

2016 compilation albums
The Long Ryders albums
Albums produced by Henry Lewy
Albums produced by Ed Stasium